Alfred Budd (22 January 1880 – 7 November 1962) was a New Zealand rugby union player. He was educated at Timaru Main School. A loose forward, Budd represented  at a provincial level, and was a member of the New Zealand national side, the All Blacks, for their tour of Australia in 1910. He played three matches on that tour, but did not appear in any internationals.

Budd remained in Australia after the tour, and he died in Melbourne in 1962.

Alf is not known to have been any relation to Alf Budd from Bluff who played for the All Blacks in 1946 and 1949.

References

1880 births
1962 deaths
Rugby union players from Timaru
New Zealand rugby union players
New Zealand international rugby union players
South Canterbury rugby union players
Rugby union flankers
New Zealand emigrants to Australia